Pearl Burris-Floyd is an American politician who previously served in the North Carolina House of Representatives representing the 110th district (including constituents in Gaston and Cleveland counties) from 2009 until 2011. A Cytologist and former Gaston County Commissioner, she now serves as the Secretary of the University of North Carolina Board of Governors.

Career
Burris-Floyd was elected to the North Carolina House of Representatives in 2008 to succeed fellow Republican Debbie Clary, who retired to run for the North Carolina Senate. in 2010 she ran for re-election to a 2nd term, but was narrowly defeated in the primary by Kelly Hastings. She ran for the seat again in 2012, where she lost to Hastings in the primary by a much wider margin. In 2020 she ran for the open office of North Carolina Commissioner of Labor being vacated by Cherie Berry. In the March primary, she came in first in her home county of Gaston, as well as in Craven, Carteret, and Lee Counties, but overall she finished 3rd behind State Representative Josh Dobson (who won the nomination) and Chuck Stanley. in 2015, Burris-Floyd was appointed to the University of North Carolina Board of Governors. She was re-appointed to the seat in 2019 for a term ending in 2023. She currently serves as the Board's Secretary.

Electoral history

2020

2012

2010

2008

Committee assignments

2009–2010 Session
Appropriations
Appropriations – Health and Human Services
Aging
Education
Education – Universities
Election Law and Campaign Finance Reform
Health
Mental Health Reform

References

External links

Living people
Year of birth missing (living people)
People from Dallas, North Carolina
University of North Carolina at Chapel Hill alumni
University of North Carolina School of Medicine alumni
Republican Party members of the North Carolina House of Representatives
21st-century American politicians